Rozina Nazish is an Indian Politician from the State of Bihar. She is elected by MLAs as Member of Bihar Legislative Council from Janata Dal (United) since 27 September 2021.

Personal life 
Tanveer Akhtar was husband of Rozina, after Akhtar's death Rozina became a member of Bihar Legislative Council.

References 

Living people
Members of the Bihar Legislative Council
Janata Dal (United) politicians
Year of birth missing (living people)